Albert Willecomme (16 April 1900 – 31 March 1971) was a French photographer.

1900 births
1971 deaths
French photographers
Landscape photographers